A TASER is a Conducted Energy Device used to incapacitate people, allowing them to be approached and handled in an unresisting and thus safe manner. It is sold by Axon, formerly TASER International. The darts are connected to the main unit by thin insulated copper wire and deliver a modulated electric current designed to disrupt voluntary control of muscles, causing "neuromuscular incapacitation." The effects of a taser may only be localized pain or strong involuntary long muscle contractions, based on the mode of use and connectivity of the darts.

Tasers are marketed as less-lethal, since the possibility of serious injury or death exists whenever the weapon is deployed. At least 49 people died in the US in 2018 after being shocked by police with a Taser.

The first taser conducted energy weapon was introduced in 1993 as a less-lethal force option for police to use to subdue fleeing, belligerent, or potentially dangerous people, who would have otherwise been subjected to more lethal force options such as firearms. , according to one study, over 15,000 law enforcement and military agencies around the world used tasers as part of their use of force continuum.

A 2009 report by the Police Executive Research Forum in the United States found that police officer injuries dropped by 76% in large law enforcement agencies that deployed taser devices in the first decade of the 21st century compared with those that did not use them at all. Axon and its CEO Rick Smith have claimed that unspecified "police surveys" show that the device has "saved 75,000 lives through 2011." A more recent academic study suggested police use of conducted electrical weapons in the United States was less risky to police officers than hands-on tactics, and showed officer injury rates equal to use of chemical sprays such as oleoresin capsicum.

History 
A US patent by Kunio Shimizu titled "Arrest device" filed in 1966 describes an electrical discharge gun with a projectile connected to a wire with a pair of electrode needles for skin attachment.

Jack Cover, a NASA researcher, began developing the first Taser in 1969. By 1974, Cover had completed the device, which he named TASER, using a loose acronym of the title of the book Tom Swift and His Electric Rifle, a book written by the Stratemeyer Syndicate under the pseudonym Victor Appleton and featuring Cover's childhood hero, Tom Swift., as the Taser delivers an electric shock. This was done on the pattern of laser, as both a Taser and a laser fire a beam at an object.

The first Taser model that was offered for sale, called the TASER Public Defender used gunpowder as its propellant, which led the Bureau of Alcohol, Tobacco and Firearms to classify it as a firearm in 1976.

Former TASER International CEO Patrick Smith testified in a TASER-related lawsuit that the catalyst for the development of the device was the "shooting death of two of his high school acquaintances" by a "guy with a legally licensed gun who lost his temper". In 1993, Rick Smith and his brother Thomas founded the original company, TASER, and began to investigate what they called "safer use of force option[s] for citizens and law enforcement". At their Scottsdale, Arizona, facilities, the brothers worked with Cover to develop a "non-firearm TASER electronic control device". The 1994 Air TASER Model 34000 conducted energy device had an "anti-felon identification (AFID) system" to prevent the likelihood that the device would be used by criminals; upon use, it released many small pieces of paper containing the serial number of the TASER device. The U.S. firearms regulator, the ATF, stated that the Air TASER conducted energy device was not a firearm.

In 1999, TASER International developed an "ergonomically handgun-shaped device called the Advanced TASER M-series systems," which used a "patented neuromuscular incapacitation (NMI) technology." In May 2003, TASER International released a new weapon called the TASER X26 conducted energy device, which used "shaped pulse technology." On July 27, 2009, TASER International released a new type of TASER device called the X3, which can fire three shots before reloading. It holds three new type cartridges, which are much thinner than the previous model. On April 5, 2017, TASER announced that it was rebranding itself as Axon to reflect its expanded business into body cameras and software. In 2018, TASER 7 conducted energy device was released, the seventh generation of TASER devices from Axon.

Function 

A TASER device fires two small dart-like electrodes, which stay connected to the main unit by thin insulated copper wire as they are propelled by small compressed nitrogen charges. The cartridge contains a pair of electrodes and propellant for a single shot and is replaced after each use. They deliver a modulated electric current designed to disrupt voluntary control of muscles, causing "neuromuscular incapacitation." The effects of a TASER device may only be localized pain or strong involuntary long muscle contractions, based on the mode of use and connectivity of the darts. The TASER device is marketed as less-lethal, since the possibility of serious injury or death exists whenever the weapon is deployed.

Practically speaking, police officers must generally be within  in order to use a Taser, though the X26's probes can travel as far as 35feet.

The electrodes are pointed to penetrate clothing, and barbed to prevent removal once in place. The original TASER device probes unspool the wire from the cartridge that causes a yaw effect before the dart stabilizes, which made it difficult to penetrate thick clothing, but newer versions (X26, C2) use a "shaped pulse" that increases effectiveness in the presence of barriers.

The TASER 7 conducted energy device is a two-shot device with increased reliability over legacy products. The conductive wires spool from the dart when the TASER 7 conducted energy device is fired, instead of spooling from the TASER cartridge which increases stability while in flight and therefore increases accuracy. The spiral darts fly straighter and faster with nearly twice the kinetic energy for better connection to the target and penetration through thicker clothing. The body of the dart breaks away to allow for containment at tough angles. TASER 7 has a 93% increased probe spread at close range, where 85% of deployments occur, according to agency reports. Rapid arc technology with adaptive cross-connection helps enable full incapacitation even at close range. TASER 7 wirelessly connects to the Axon network, allowing for easier updates and inventory management.

A TASER device may provide a safety benefit to police officers. The use of a TASER device has a greater deployment range than batons, pepper spray, or empty hand techniques. This allows police to maintain a greater distance. A 2008 study of use-of-force incidents by the Calgary Police Service conducted by the Canadian Police Research Centre found that the use of the TASER device resulted in fewer injuries than the use of batons or empty hand techniques. The study found that only pepper spray was a safer intervention option.

Models 
Axon currently has three models of TASER conducted electrical weapons (CEWs) available for law enforcement use and civilian use. Axon currently has work underway for a new model, the TASER 10. 

The TASER X26P device is a single-shot CEW that is the smallest, most compact SMART WEAPON of all four Axon models.  

The TASER X2 device is a two-shot TASER CEW with a warning arc and dual lasers. The warning arc is a function the officer can utilize with the push of a button to intimidate an aggressor, warn a potential assailant, and gain compliance of a suspect without having to deploy the loaded cartridges. During the warning arc mode, the TASER CEW will display an arc of electricity at the front of the device. 

The TASER 7 device is the second newest of all four CEWs. It is a two-shot device with spiral darts that spool from the dart allowing the probes to fly straighter. The TASER 7 device's rapid arc technology with adaptive cross connections allows for full incapacitation.  The TASER 7 CEW connects wirelessly to the Axon Evidence network that includes inventory management capabilities among other things.

The TASER 10 device was officially announced by Axon on January 24, 2023. The TASER 10 was dubbed the "less-lethal weapon of its era" by Axon. The new TASER 10, which has not yet been released to the public nor law enforcement, is still in its prototypical stages. In addition to the functions of the TASER 7, the TASER 10 features a more efficient battery, an increased probe distance by up to 45 feet, waterproof capabilities, increased probe velocity (205 feet per second), and ability to deploy the probes individually allowing the officer to create their own "spread" unlike previous models, which relied heavily on precise aiming of the prongs at a fixed angle with the assistance of two lasers. It is not yet immediately clear if this device outputs a stronger or same voltage than its predecessors.

Lethality 

As with all less-lethal weapons, use of the TASER system is never risk free. Sharp metal projectiles and electricity are in use, so misuse or abuse of the weapon increases the likelihood that serious injury or death may occur.  In addition, the manufacturer has identified other risk factors that may increase the risks of use.  Children, pregnant women, the elderly, and very thin individuals are considered at higher risk.  Persons with known medical problems, such as heart disease, history of seizure, or have a pacemaker are also at greater risk. Axon also warns that repeated, extended, or continuous exposure to the weapon is not safe. Because of this, the Police Executive Research Forum says that total exposure should not exceed 15 seconds.

There are other circumstances that pose higher secondary risks of serious injury or death, including:

 Uncontrolled falls or subjects falling from elevated positions
 Persons running on hard or rough surfaces, like asphalt
 Persons operating machinery or conveyances (cars, motorcycles, bikes, skateboards)
 Places where explosive or flammable substances are present

Fulton County, Georgia District Attorney Paul Howard Jr. said in 2020 that "under Georgia law, a taser is considered as a deadly weapon." A 2012 study published in the American Heart Association's journal Circulation found that Tasers can cause "ventricular arrhythmias, sudden cardiac arrest and even death." In 2014, NAACP State Conference President Scot X. Esdaile and the Connecticut NAACP argued that Tasers cause lethal results. Reuters reported that more than 1,000 people shocked with a Taser by police died through the end of 2018, nearly all of them since the early 2000s. At least 49 people died in the US in 2018 after being shocked by police with a Taser.

Drive Stun Capability  
Some TASER device models, particularly those used by police departments, also have a "Drive Stun" capability, where the TASER device is held against the target without firing the projectiles, and is intended to cause pain without incapacitating the target. "Drive Stun" is "the process of using the EMD (Electro Muscular Disruption) weapon as a pain compliance technique. This is done by activating the TASER [device] and placing it against an individual's body. This can be done without an air cartridge in place or after an air cartridge has been deployed."

Guidelines released in 2011 by the U.S. Department of Justice recommend that use of Drive Stun as a pain compliance technique be avoided. The guidelines were issued by a joint committee of the Police Executive Research Forum and the U.S. Department of Justice Office of Community Oriented Policing Services. The guidelines state "Using the CEW to achieve pain compliance may have limited effectiveness and, when used repeatedly, may even exacerbate the situation by inducing rage in the subject."

A study of U.S. police and sheriff departments found that 29.6% of the jurisdictions allowed the use of Drive Stun for gaining compliance in a passive resistance arrest scenario, with no physical contact between the officer and the subject. For a scenario that also includes non-violent physical contact, this number is 65.2%.

A Las Vegas police document says "The Drive Stun causes significant localized pain in the area touched by the TASER [CEW], but does not have a significant effect on the central nervous system. The Drive Stun does not incapacitate a subject but may assist in taking a subject into custody." The UCLA TASER device incident and the University of Florida TASER device incident involved university police officers using their TASER device's "Drive Stun" capability (referred to as a "contact tase" in the University of Florida Offense Report).

Amnesty International has expressed particular concern about Drive Stun, noting that "the potential to use TASERs in drive-stun mode—where they are used as 'pain compliance' tools when individuals are already effectively in custody—and the capacity to inflict multiple and prolonged shocks, renders the weapons inherently open to abuse."

Users 

According to a 2011 study by the United States Department of Justice's National Institute of Justice entitled Police Use of Force, TASERs and Other Less-Lethal Weapons, over 15,000 law enforcement and military agencies around the world used TASER devices as part of their use of force continuum. Just as the number of agencies deploying TASER conducted energy weapons has continued to increase each year, so too the number of TASER device related "incidents" between law enforcement officers and suspects has been on the rise.

Excited Delirium Syndrome

Some of the deaths associated with TASER devices have been given a diagnosis of excited delirium, a term for a phenomenon that manifests as a combination of delirium, psychomotor agitation, anxiety, hallucinations, speech disturbances, disorientation, violent and bizarre behavior, insensitivity to pain, elevated body temperature, and increased strength. Excited delirium is associated with sudden death (usually via cardiac or respiratory arrest), particularly following the use of physical control measures, including police restraint and TASER devices. Excited delirium most commonly arises in male subjects with a history of serious mental illness or acute or chronic drug abuse, particularly stimulant drugs such as cocaine. Alcohol withdrawal or head trauma may also contribute to the condition.

The diagnosis of excited delirium has been controversial. Excited delirium has been listed as a cause of death by some medical examiners for several years, mainly as a diagnosis of exclusion established on autopsy. Additionally, academic discussion of excited delirium has been largely confined to forensic science literature, providing limited documentation about patients that survive the condition. These circumstances have led some civil liberties groups to question the cause of death diagnosis, claiming that excited delirium has been used to "excuse and exonerate" law enforcement authorities following the death of detained subjects, a possible "conspiracy or cover-up for brutality" when restraining agitated individuals. Also contributing to the controversy is the role of TASER device use in excited delirium deaths.

Excited delirium is not found in the current version of the Diagnostic and Statistical Manual of Mental Disorders; however. the term "excited delirium" has been accepted by the National Association of Medical Examiners and the American College of Emergency Physicians, who argued in a 2009 white paper that "excited delirium" may be described by several codes within the ICD-9. The American College of Emergency Physicians "rejects the theory" that excited delirium is an "invented syndrome" used to excuse or cover-up the use of excessive force by law enforcement.

Usage Worldwide

Australia 
Tasers are prohibited for civilian ownership in Australia in every state and territory. A weapons permit is required to purchase and own a taser.

Canada 
As with the UK and Ireland, only members of law enforcement are allowed to own a taser legally. However, according to an article by The Globe and Mail, many Canadians illegally purchase tasers from the US, where they are legal.

China
Under the Law of the People's Republic of China on the Control of Firearms and Public Security Punishment Law, tasers are prohibited for civilian ownership in China without an application for a state licence. A weapons permit is required to purchase and own a taser.

Germany 
Since April 2008, tasers can be legally purchased by persons 18 and older, but can only be carried by persons with a firearm carry permit, which is only issued under very restricted conditions.

In 2001, Germany approved a pilot project allowing individual states to issue tasers to their SEK teams (police tactical units); by 2018, 13 out of 16 states had done so. A number of states have also provided a limited number of tasers to their general police forces. Some states, such as Berlin, have use of force guidelines that only permit taser use where firearm use would also be justified.

Under current law, the Federal Police is not authorized to use tasers.

The Bundeswehr (German armed forces) does not issue tasers nor are they used in training.

Ireland 
Under the Firearms Act of 1925, tasers, pepper spray and stun guns are illegal to possess or purchase in Ireland, even with a valid firearms certificate.

Jamaica 
Tasers are legal for civilians to own, provided they possess a valid permit under the Customs Act. Currently, Police in Jamaica do not have access to tasers, but in February 2021 Corporal James Rohan, Chairman of the Police Federation, requested access to non-lethal weaponry in order to deal more effectively with encounters with mentally ill individuals.

Japan
Under the Swords and Firearms Control Law, import, carrying, purchase and use of stun guns or tasers is currently completely prohibited in Japan.

Russia
Stun guns and tasers are made in Russia can be purchased for self-defense without special permission, however, under the Federal Law No. 150 "On Weapons" of the Russian Federation it's illegal to import and subsequent sale of any foreign stun devices or tasers into the country. The ban has been in place since the first version of the law was approved in 1996.

Saudi Arabia 
Tasers are classified as weapons under Federal Law No. 3 of 2009, and therefore require a valid license to own or import.

UK 
Tasers have been in use by Britain police forces since 2001, 2002, and 2003, and they require 18 hours of initial training, followed by six hours of annual top-up training, in order for a police officer to be allowed to carry and use one. Members of the general public are not allowed to own tasers, with possession or sale of a taser punishable by up to 10 years in prison. As of September 2019, 30,548 (19%) of police officers were trained to use tasers. Tasers were used 23,000 times from March 2018 to March 2019, compared to only 10,000 times in 2013. In March 2020, extra funding was provided to purchase devices to allow more than 8,000 extra British police officers to carry a taser.

Use on Children 
There has been considerable controversy over the use of TASER devices on children and in schools. In 2004, the parents of a 6-year-old boy in Miami sued the Miami-Dade County Police department for firing a TASER device at their child. The police said the boy was threatening to injure his own leg with a shard of glass, and said that using the device was the safest option to prevent the boy from injuring himself. The boy's mother told CNN that the three officers involved probably found it easier not to reason with her child. In the same county two weeks later, a 12-year-old girl skipping school and drinking alcohol was tased while she was running from police. The Miami-Dade County Police reported that the girl had started to run into traffic and that the TASER device was deployed to stop her from being hit by cars or causing an automobile accident. In March 2008, an 11-year-old girl was subdued with a TASER device. In March 2009, a 15-year-old boy died from alcohol-induced excited delirium in Michigan after being tased.

Police claim that the use of TASER conducted energy weapons on smaller subjects and elderly subjects is safer than alternative methods of subduing suspects, alleging that striking them or falling on them will cause much more injury than a TASER device, because the device is designed to only cause the contraction of muscles. Critics counter that TASER devices may interact with pre-existing medical complications such as medications, and may even contribute to someone's death as a result. Critics also suggest that using a TASER conducted electrical weapon on a minor, particularly a young child, is effectively cruel and abusive punishment, or unnecessary.

Use on Non-Human Subjects 
Tasers are used to immobilize wildlife for research, relocation, or treatment. Since they are classified as a form of torture, it is more common to use tranquilizer darts.

Use in Torture 
A report from a meeting of the United Nations Committee Against Torture states that "The Committee was worried that the use of TASER X26 weapons, provoking extreme pain, constituted a form of torture, and that in certain cases it could also cause death, as shown by several reliable studies and by certain cases that had happened after practical use." Amnesty International has also raised extensive concerns about the use of other electro-shock devices by American police and in American prisons, as they can be (and according to Amnesty International, sometimes are) used to inflict cruel pain on individuals. Maurice Cunningham of South Carolina, while an inmate at the Lancaster County Detention Center, was subjected to continuous shock for 2 minutes 49 seconds, which a medical examiner said caused cardiac arrhythmia and his subsequent death. He was 29 years old and had no alcohol or drugs in his system.

In response to the claims that the pain inflicted by the use of the TASER device could potentially constitute torture, Tom Smith, the Chairman of the TASER Board, stated that the U.N. is "out of touch" with the needs of modern policing and asserted that "Pepper spray goes on for hours and hours, hitting someone with a baton breaks limbs, shooting someone with a firearm causes permanent damage, even punching and kicking—the intent of those tools is to inflict pain, ... with the TASER device, the intent is not to inflict pain; it's to end the confrontation. When it's over, it's over."

Legality

See Also 
 Braidwood Inquiry – official Canadian inquiry into TASER CEWs and similar devices
 Dazzler (weapon)
 Death of Beto Laudisio
 Graduated Electronic Decelerator
 History of New York divorce coercion gang
 Robert Dziekański TASER CEW incident
 Stun belt
 Tom Swift and His War Tank, also by "Victor Appleton"

References

External links 
 "TASERs in medicine: an irreverent call for proposals"—editorial in Canadian Medical Association Journal by Matthew B. Stanbrook, MD PhD, 2008
 TASER CEW laws by state and city, local and state, by Ryan R. Karpilo, 2012
 "The Use of Conducted Energy Devices (TASERs)", TELEMASP Bulletin, Texas Law Enforcement Management and Administrative Statistics Program
 "When TASERs Fail" (podcast) transcript (11 May 2019). Reveal and Public Radio Exchange.

 
American inventions
Brands that became generic
Instruments of torture
Non-lethal weapons
Police weapons